Juon may refer to:

 Paul Juon, noted classical composer
 Steve 'Flash' Juon, OHHLA webmaster, founder of rec.music.hip-hop and more
 Ju-on, a series of horror films originating in Japan; remade in English as The Grudge by the same director